Rudnianska Lehota is a village and municipality in Prievidza District in the Trenčín Region of western Slovakia.

History
In historical records the village was first mentioned in 1477.

Geography
The municipality lies at an altitude of 350 metres and covers an area of 12.232 km2. It has a population of about 722 people.

External links
http://www.statistics.sk/mosmis/eng/run.html

Villages and municipalities in Prievidza District